Charged multivesicular body protein 5 is a protein that in humans is encoded by the CHMP5 gene.

Function 

CHMP5 belongs to the chromatin-modifying protein/charged multivesicular body protein (CHMP) family. These proteins are components of ESCRT-III (endosomal sorting complex required for transport III), a complex involved in degradation of surface receptor proteins and formation of endocytic multivesicular bodies (MVBs). Some CHMPs have both nuclear and cytoplasmic/vesicular distributions, and one such CHMP, CHMP1A, is required for both MVB formation and regulation of cell cycle progression.

References

External links

Further reading